This is list of major wetlands (including bogs) in Estonia. The list is incomplete.

References 

Waterfalls
 
Estonia